Washington Township is a township in Franklin County, Pennsylvania, United States. The population was 14,897 at the 2020 census, up from 14,009 at the 2010 census.

History
The township was formed out of Antrim Township, Pennsylvania. The township was named in honor of General George Washington.

Handycraft Farmstead, Harbaugh's Reformed Church, Jeremiah Burns Farm, Red Run Lodge, Monterey Historic District, Springdale Mills, Waynesboro Armory, and the Welty's Mill Bridge are listed on the National Register of Historic Places.

Geography
The township occupies the southeastern corner of Franklin County, bounded to the east by Adams County and to the south by Washington and Frederick counties in the state of Maryland. The township surrounds the borough of Waynesboro, a separate municipality.

The western two-thirds of the township are in the Great Appalachian Valley, while the eastern third is on the ridges and valleys of South Mountain. The Appalachian Trail traverses South Mountain through the township.

Unincorporated communities in the township include Wayne Heights, Rouzerville, Pen Mar, Blue Ridge Summit, and Monterey.

The township is drained by the East and West Branches of Antietam Creek, a south-flowing tributary of the Potomac River. The extreme east end of the township lies east of the crest of South Mountain and is part of the Monocacy River watershed, another tributary of the Potomac.

Communities

  Beartown
  Blue Ridge Summit
  Buena Vista Springs
  Charmian
  Cress
  Eastland Hills
  Glen Forney
  Midvale
  Monterey
  Pen Mar
  Pennersville
  Polktown
  Roadside
  Rouzerville
  Wayne Heights
  Zullinger

Neighboring Townships

  Antrim Township (west)
  Hamiltonban Township (Adams County), (east)
  Liberty Township (Adams County), (east)
  Quincy Township

Climate

Education
Washington Township lies within Waynesboro Area School District.

Schools serving Washington Township
Fairview Avenue Elementary School
Hooverville Elementary School
Mowrey Elementary School
Summitville Elementary School
Waynesboro Area Middle School
Waynesboro Area Senior High School

Infrastructure

Major Highways

Utilities
Cable TV - Comcast
Electric - West Penn Power
Natural Gas - UGI Corporation
Telephone - Century Link
Trash and Recycling Services - Waste Management, IESI, Hoppers, Parks Garbage Service, or Worthy's Refuse Inc.
Water and Sewer Authorities - Washington Township Municipal Authority

Healthcare
WellSpan Waynesboro Hospital (located in Waynesboro, PA)

Parks and Recreation
Washington Township owns and maintains six parks and the Rouzerville Community Center located within the Township boundaries.
Antietam Meadow Park
Happel's Meadow Wetland
Pat O'Connor Nature Park
Pine Hill Recreation Area
Red Run Park
Rolando Park

Demographics

As of the census of 2000, there were 11,559 people, 4,577 households, and 3,469 families residing in the township.  The population density was 297.2 people per square mile (114.8/km).  There were 4,840 housing units at an average density of 124.4/sq mi (48.1/km).  The racial makeup of the township was 97.08% White, 1.01% African American, 0.15% Native American, 0.90% Asian, 0.03% Pacific Islander, 0.34% from other races, and 0.49% from two or more races. Hispanic or Latino of any race were 0.80% of the population.

There were 4,577 households, out of which 30.5% had children under the age of 18 living with them, 65.6% were married couples living together, 7.1% had a female householder with no husband present, and 24.2% were non-families. 20.5% of all households were made up of individuals, and 9.2% had someone living alone who was 65 years of age or older.  The average household size was 2.52 and the average family size was 2.90.

In the township the population was spread out, with 23.2% under the age of 18, 7.0% from 18 to 24, 28.0% from 25 to 44, 26.0% from 45 to 64, and 15.8% who were 65 years of age or older.  The median age was 40 years. For every 100 females, there were 96.4 males.  For every 100 females age 18 and over, there were 95.1 males.

The median income for a household in the township was $45,165, and the median income for a family was $51,791. Males had a median income of $36,255 versus $25,192 for females. The per capita income for the township was $20,673.  About 2.6% of families and 3.9% of the population were below the poverty line, including 3.2% of those under age 18 and 6.2% of those age 65 or over.

References

External links
Washington Township official website

Populated places established in 1735
Townships in Franklin County, Pennsylvania
Townships in Pennsylvania